Joseph Timilty may refer to:

Joseph F. Timilty (police commissioner) (1894–1980), Boston police commissioner, 1936–1943
Joseph F. Timilty (state senator) (1938–2017), member of the Boston City Council from 1967 to 1971 and the Massachusetts Senate from 1972 to 1985